El Ronco  Airport  was an airport formerly serving the Holcim, Ltd. El Ronco cement plant  west of Metapán in Santa Ana Department, El Salvador.

Google Earth Historical Imagery shows the  grass runway closed some time after 2004, and construction of plant facilities on the northern half begun in 2011.

See also

Transport in El Salvador
List of airports in El Salvador

References

External links
OurAirports - El Ronco
OpenStreetMap - El Ronco
FallingRain - El Ronco

Defunct airports
Airports in El Salvador
Santa Ana Department
Metapán